Andrez Joseph (born 20 May 1998) is a Dominican international footballer who plays for Louisiana Krewe FC in USL League Two.

International career
Joseph was first called up to the Dominica senior national side in March 2016, and made his debut the same month, playing 90 minutes in a 7–0 win against the British Virgin Islands during 2017 Caribbean Cup qualification.

Career statistics

International

References

External links
 Andrez Joseph at Caribbean Football Database
 USL League Two bio

1998 births
Living people
Association football defenders
Dominica footballers
Dominica international footballers
Dominica expatriate sportspeople in the United States
LSU–Alexandria Generals men's soccer players
USL League Two players